Rhipidocladum is a genus of New World woody bamboo in the grass family). It found in Mesoamerica, Trinidad, and South America. The genus is characterized by 1) erect, non-pseudopetiolate culm leaves, 2) numerous branchlets arising in an aspidate (fan-like) array, and 3) fruits being true caryopses. The name is derived from the Greek rhipid meaning "fanlike" and clad meaning "branch".

Species
 Rhipidocladum abregoensis - Colombia (Norte de Santander)
 Rhipidocladum ampliflorum - Venezuela
 Rhipidocladum angustiflorum - Colombia, Venezuela
 Rhipidocladum bartlettii - Mexico (Chiapas, Yucatán Peninsula), Belize, Guatemala, Honduras
 Rhipidocladum clarkiae - Costa Rica
 Rhipidocladum harmonicum - from southern Mexico to Bolivia
 Rhipidocladum martinezii - Mexico (Chiapas)
 Rhipidocladum maxonii - Costa Rica, Guyana
 Rhipidocladum neumannii - Argentina (Salta, Tucumán), Bolivia (La Paz, Santa Cruz, Tarija)
 Rhipidocladum pacuarense - Nicaragua, Costa Rica
 Rhipidocladum panamense - Panamá
 Rhipidocladum parviflorum - Venezuela, Colombia, Perú, Bolivia, Brazil, Panamá
 Rhipidocladum pittieri - from Mexico (Michoacán) to Panamá
 Rhipidocladum prestoei - Trinidad
 Rhipidocladum racemiflorum - Mexico from Tucumán to Tamaulipas
 Rhipidocladum sibilans - Venezuela, Guyana

Formerly included
see Actinocladum Didymogonyx 
 Rhipidocladum geminatum - Didymogonyx geminatum 
 Rhipidocladum longispiculatum  - Didymogonyx longispiculatum
 Rhipidocladum verticillatum - Actinocladum verticillatum

References

Bambusoideae genera
Bambusoideae